Tasqueña (sometimes also spelled Taxqueña) is a station on Line 2 of the Mexico City Metro system. It is located in the Campestre Churubusco neighborhood, within the Coyoacán borough of Mexico City, directly south of the city centre on Avenida Tasqueña and Canal de Miramontes. It is a surface station and the southern terminus of the line. In 2019, the station had an average ridership of 83,463 passengers per day, making it the seventh busiest station in the network.

General information
The station's name comes from Avenida Tasqueña, which in turn was taken from Taxco, Guerrero, an important silver mining town during the colonial period. The station icon represents a crescent moon.

Tasqueña connects Line 2 with the Xochimilco Light Rail line, which runs from this station to the borough of Xochimilco. It also connects with two trolleybus lines: route A, running between Tasqueña and Metro Autobuses del Norte, north of the city, and route K, running between Ciudad Universitaria (UNAM's main campus) and the San Lorenzo Teconzo campus of the Universidad Autónoma de la Ciudad de México (UACM).

 Metro Tasqueña also serves Mexico City's southern bus depot, which serves important cities like Cuernavaca, Acapulco, Taxco, and the rest of southern Mexico.

The station has four hexagonal murals from Alberto Castro Leñero: "Fuego", "Aliento", "Azul" y "Horizontal". Each mural is 11 meters high and 3 meters wide. The murals are made of pieces of talavera and polychromatic ceramic.

The terminal currently causes major traffic problems in the neighborhood, mainly by public buses and taxi cabs trying to cruise and flow into the terminals to pick up passengers both from the subway and the regional bus lines. It has become a major gathering center for informal merchants, selling of illegally reproduced media, prostitution and environmental pollution.

Nearby
Terminal Central de Autobuses del Sur, bus depot.

Exits
South: Between Calzada Taxqueña, Canal de Miramontes and Calzada de Tlalpan, Campestre Churubusco
North: Canal de Miramontes and Cerro de Jesús street, Campestre Churubusco

Ridership

See also 
 List of Mexico City metro stations

References

External links
 

Mexico City Metro Line 2 stations
1970 establishments in Mexico
Railway stations opened in 1970
Mexico City Metro stations in Coyoacán
Accessible Mexico City Metro stations